Dolichoctis rotundata is a species of beetle in the subfamily Lamiinae, that is endemic to Malaysia. It is black coloured with yellow dots on its wings. Adults are on wing from April to June.

References

Lebiinae
Beetles described in 1846
Beetles of Asia
Endemic fauna of Malaysia